Kazim Pasha is a Pakistani television director and producer. His directions also include a film Ghazi Shaheed (1998). He is the father of TV show host Nida Yasir.

Dramas
 Uljhan 
 Jangloos
 Chhaon
 Iʻtirāf
 Gurez
 Sirriyan
 Manḍī
 Seerhian
 Sirrihiyan

Movies
 Ghazi Shaheed - 1998

Awards
 Pride of Performance - 2011

References

Living people
Pakistani television directors
Pakistani television producers
Pakistani film directors
Recipients of the Pride of Performance
Year of birth missing (living people)